This was the inaugural season for the League Cup and the competition was known as the Players No.6 Trophy for sponsorship reasons.

Halifax won the trophy by beating Wakefield Trinity by the score of 22-11 in the final. The match was played at Odsal in the City of Bradford. The attendance was 7975 and receipts were £2545.

Background 
The council of the Rugby Football League had been investigating the possibility of another knock-out competition for several seasons, to be similar to the association football league cup competition played for by the Scottish Football Association (first competed for in 1946-47) and The Football Association (first competed for 1961). It was to be a similar knock-out structure to, and to be secondary to, the Challenge Cup. The council voted to introduce the new competition at the same time as sports sponsorship was becoming more prevalent and as a result John Player and Sons, a division of Imperial Tobacco Company, became sponsors, and the competition never became widely known as the "League Cup"

The competition ran from 1971–72 until 1995-96 and was initially intended for the professional clubs plus the two amateur BARLA National Cup finalists. In later seasons the entries were expanded to take in other amateur and French teams. The competition was dropped, the main reason being given was due to "fixture congestion", when Rugby League became a summer sport
The Rugby League season always (until the onset of "Summer Rugby" in 1996) ran from around August-time through to around May-time and this "League Cup" competition always took place early in the season, in the Autumn, with the final usually taking place in late January

The competition was variably known, by its sponsorship name, as the Player's No.6 Trophy (1971–1977), the John Player Trophy (1977–1983), the John Player Special Trophy (1983–1989), and the Regal Trophy in 1989.

Competition and results

Round 1 - First round 

Involved 16 matches and 32 clubs

Round 1 - First round Replays 
Involved 3 matches and 6 clubs

Round 2 - Second round 

Involved 8 matches and 16 clubs

Round 3 -Quarter-finals 

Involved 4 matches with 8 clubs

Round 3 -Quarter-finals - replays 
Involved 1 match with 2 clubs

Round 4 – Semi-finals 

Involved 2 matches and 4 clubs

Final

Teams and scorers 

Scoring - Try = three points - Goal = two points - Drop goal = one point (reduced from this season)

Prize money 
As part of the sponsorship deal and funds, the prize money awarded to the competing teams for this season is as follows :-

Note - the author is unable to trace the rest of the award amounts. Can anyone help ?

The road to success

Player's Top Try Contest 

As part of the sponsorship deal, a Top Try Contest was held. This involved all the professional first round Players No.6 Trophy Losers.

One match was played by each club and the four clubs scoring the most tries received prize money.

This competition was not a success and was only held for this season.

This series Involved 7 matches and 14 clubs.

The table 
The club scoring the most tries finished top.

In the case of a tie, the deciding items were :-
 1 The club scoring the most tries
 2 The club scoring the most points
 3 The club with the fewest points against
The table showing finishing positions and the awards were as follows :

Note * Widnes took 4th place ahead of Dewsbury as they scored more points - and therefore were awarded the prize money

Notes and comments 
1 * Thames Board Mills were a Junior (amateur) club from Warrington
2 * Thames Board Mills opted to play the match at Wilderspool, the home of Warrington
3 * Ace Amateurs were a Junior (amateur) club from Hull
4 * Ace Amateurs were drawn at Home but agreed to switch the venue to Central Park, the home ground of Wigan
5  * Odsal is the home ground of Bradford Northern from 1890 to 2010 and the current capacity is in the region of 26,000, The ground is famous for hosting the largest attendance at an English sports ground when 102,569 (it was reported that over 120,000 actually attended as several areas of boundary fencing collapse under the sheer weight of numbers) attended the replay of the Challenge Cup final on 5 May 1954 to see Halifax v Warrington

See also 
1971–72 Northern Rugby Football League season
1971 Lancashire Cup
1971 Yorkshire Cup
Player's No.6 Trophy
Rugby league county cups

References

External links
Saints Heritage Society
1896–97 Northern Rugby Football Union season at wigan.rlfans.com
Hull&Proud Fixtures & Results 1896/1897
Widnes Vikings - One team, one passion Season In Review - 1896-97
The Northern Union at warringtonwolves.org
Huddersfield R L Heritage
Wakefield until I die

1971 in English rugby league
1972 in English rugby league
League Cup (rugby league)